Giorgia Apollonio (born 13 March 1988 in Pieve di Cadore) is an Italian curler.

Apollonio started playing curling in 1997. She plays in third position and is right-handed.

References

External links
 

1988 births
Living people
Italian female curlers